Housewives on the Job is a 1972 German erotic comedy film directed by Ernst Hofbauer and starring Ingrid Steeger, Marie-Georges Pascal, and Elisabeth Volkmann. Released in 1973, Housewives on the Job is one of the six Hausfrauen Report films produced by Hofbauer, also known for his other sex report film series of Schulmädchen-Report.

Synopsis
Budapest, Londres, Madrid, New-York, Paris, Munich: Bernt Mittler goes on report about housewives sexual life.

Cast
 Gernot Mohner : Bernt Mittler
 Angelika Baumgart : Brigitte Mittler

Paris :
 Marie-Georges Pascal : Janine
 Paul Bisciglia : Gérard, Janine's husband
 Philippe Gasté : taxi driver

Budapest :
 Anne Libert : Ilona
 Katharina Herbecq : Marika
 Claus Tinney : Istvan

Londres :
 Shirley Corrigan : Grace Stevenson
 Horst keitel : Richard Stevenson
 Peter Kranz : Marty Stevenson

Madrid :
 Elisabeth Volkmann : Doña Dolores
 Rinaldo Talamonti : Dolores's lover
 Erich Padalewski : Don Geronimo
 Gaby Borck : Candelaria

New-York :
 Günther Kieslich : Doctor Goodfellow
 Dorothea Rau : Mabel
 Ingrid Steeger : Sheila
 Karin Lorson : Pamela

Munich :
 Maria Raber ...  Linda
 Josef Moosholzer : Xaver Kirchhofer

References

External links
 
 
 Housewives on the Job at Encyclo-Ciné
 Hausfrauen-Report international at Filmportal.de

1973 films
West German films
1970s German-language films
1970s sex comedy films
German sex comedy films
German anthology films
Films set in Paris
Films directed by Ernst Hofbauer
1973 comedy films
1970s German films